Cross Fork is a  tributary of Kettle Creek in Potter County, Pennsylvania, in the United States.

Cross Fork joins Kettle Creek at the village of Cross Fork.

See also
Hammersley Fork
List of rivers of Pennsylvania

References

Rivers of Pennsylvania
Tributaries of the West Branch Susquehanna River
Rivers of Potter County, Pennsylvania